Han Wenxia (born August 23, 1976 in Dalian, Liaoning) is a Chinese football player who competed for the national team in the 2008 Summer Olympics. Her position is that of goalkeeper.

Major performances
 1994/1997/2007 National League - 1st/2nd/2nd
 1995/2004/2007 National Championship - 1st/2nd/1st
 1995 National Super Champions Cup - 1st
 1999 World Cup - 2nd
 1999/2008 Asian Cup - 1st/2nd
 2004 Olympic Qualification Asian Zone - 1st
 2005 National Games - 2nd

Personal life
Her brother Han Wenhai was a goalkeeper for the China national football team.

References

 http://2008teamchina.olympic.cn/index.php/personview/personsen/865
 Athlete Biography - Han Wenxia (archive)

External links 
 
 
 
 
 

1976 births
Living people
Chinese women's footballers
China women's international footballers
Footballers at the 2000 Summer Olympics
Footballers at the 2008 Summer Olympics
Olympic footballers of China
2003 FIFA Women's World Cup players
2007 FIFA Women's World Cup players
Footballers from Dalian
Women's association football goalkeepers
Asian Games medalists in football
Footballers at the 2006 Asian Games
Asian Games bronze medalists for China
Medalists at the 2006 Asian Games
1999 FIFA Women's World Cup players